Ambodala railway station is a railway station on the East Coast Railway network in the state of Odisha, India. It serves Ambodala village. Its code is AMB. It has two platforms. Passenger, Express and Superfast trains halt at Ambodala railway station.

Major trains

 Korba–Visakhapatnam Express
 Dhanbad–Alappuzha Express
 Bilaspur–Tirupati Express
 Sambalpur–Rayagada Intercity Express
 Tapaswini Express
 Samata Express
 Samaleshwari Express
 Durg–Jagdalpur Express

See also
 Rayagada district

References

Railway stations in Rayagada district
Sambalpur railway division